Shirley Smith may refer to:
 Mum (Shirl) Smith (1924–1998), Aboriginal Australian famous for her welfare work
 Shirley Smith (politician), member of the Ohio Senate
 Shirley Smith (lawyer) (1916–2007), New Zealand lawyer
 Hubert Shirley-Smith (1901–1981), British civil engineer